The Tanami toadlet (Uperoleia micromeles) is a species of frog in the family Myobatrachidae.
It is endemic to Australia.
Its natural habitats are subtropical or tropical dry shrubland, subtropical or tropical dry lowland grassland, and intermittent freshwater marshes.

References

Uperoleia
Amphibians of Western Australia
Amphibians of the Northern Territory
Taxonomy articles created by Polbot
Amphibians described in 1981
Frogs of Australia